LGBT+ Liberal Democrats is a British lesbian, gay, bisexual, transgender and other sexual minorities equality group of the Liberal Democrats political party. The organisation is one of several Specified Associated Organisations, giving it special status within the party, and has been referred to as one of the "most important" of such groups. The group campaigns both within the party and UK-wide on LGBT+ issues, as well as mentoring and providing advice to the party's candidates.

Formation and early years 
Initially known as Democrats for Lesbian & Gay Action, or DELGA for short, the organisation was formed in 1988 from the groups "Liberal Lesbian & Gay Action" and "Social Democrats for Lesbian & Gay Action". The parent parties of those organisations, the Liberal Party and SDP, had merged to form the Social and Liberal Democrats, known generally as the Democrats. The name was officially altered to be Liberal Democrats for Lesbian, Gay, Bisexual and Transgender Action in 1996, including bisexual and transgender people in the title and reflecting the renaming of the party to the Liberal Democrats. However, the shorthand DELGA remained in use until 2011, when the organisation renamed to "LGBT+ Liberal Democrats".

One of the early campaigns by the group was "16 or bust". Started in 1991, it pushed to lower the age of consent for sex between gay men from 21 to 16, equal with heterosexual couples. This was in contrast to the approach of organisations such as Stonewall who were in favour of lowering the age to 18, seeing it as an achievable compromise. Although the first round of votes in parliament only lowered the age of consent to 18, it was finally brought in line with opposite-sex couples in 2000.

Policy successes 

Because LGBT+ Liberal Democrats is recognised as a Specified Associated Organisation of the Liberal Democrat party it is able to put forward policy motions to the twice-yearly Federal Conference, the main democratic policy making forum of the party.

Motions accepted for debate and passed into party policy have included:

 2011: "Science Not Stigma" motion on blood donation rules in the UK.
 2010: "Equal Marriage in the United Kingdom" motion on the introduction of same-sex marriage.
 2008: "Deportation to States which Persecute on the Grounds of Sexuality and Gender Identity" on treatment of LGBT asylum seekers.
 1988: Repeal of Section 28, Criminalisation of incitement to hatred on the grounds of sexual orientation, prohibition of legal and social discrimination on the grounds of sexual orientation.

Fringe events 
LGBT+ Liberal Democrats runs a series of fringe events discussing various topic issues at Liberal Democrat conference each year, including regular joint fringes with LGBT+ campaigning organisation Stonewall.

Events at a joint 2011 fringe received widespread coverage after then Stonewall Chair, Ben Summerskill stated that his organisation did not support equal marriage and that he believed it would cost £5 billion to implement. The statement resulted in critical comments from prominent campaigner Peter Tatchell and openly gay Liberal Democrat MP Stephen Gilbert, who stated "it should not be up to me as a member of parliament to lobby Stonewall on equal rights. It should be Stonewall lobbying me". The controversy later caused a split within Stonewall itself, following further criticism from founder members Ian McKellen and Michael Cashman.

2013 apologies 
In 2013, both G4S and TalkTalk were forced to apologise to the organisation, following separate incidents. In the first incident G4S, who provided conference security, had insisted on checking banners being carried by members of the group for "potentially offensive campaign material". Three months later, TalkTalk issued an apology after their web filter classified the organisation's web site as pornographic.

Views on MPs

Tim Farron
Many members of the group, while denying that former party leader Tim Farron is a homophobe, have been openly critical of his answers to questions about his views on the sinfulness of gay sex during the 2017 general election, viewing it as a distraction from the party's pro-LGBT record. Former head of the LGBT+ Liberal Democrats Chris Cooke made unsubstantiated complaints to the party about Farron's personal conduct when "drunk", and admitted that he "made up a story to cause trouble" following his suspension over Twitter comments directed at Conservative MP Anna Soubry.

Farron's continued fraternisation with evangelical anti-'gay lobby' groups has been seen by the LGBT+ Liberal Democrats as a lapse of judgement, with them asking him to apologise for a "lack of care" shown to the LGBT community.

Dr Phillip Lee
On 3 September 2019, Conservative MP Phillip Lee joined the Lib Dems in opposition to Brexit.

Moments after he had defected, LGBT+ Liberal Democrat chair Jennie Rigg along with the vice chair, executive members and several other activists left the party in opposition to Lee’s views on same-sex marriage and his previous campaign to bar people with HIV from being able to come to the UK.

A subsequent meeting took place between Lee and the LGBT+ Lib Dems at their annual conference to discuss his views.

Having previously said "Marriage should be left to the churches and the redefinition of marriage simply required more debate and consultation", Lee later insisted that his views on LGBT+ rights and had been misrepresented, stating that he was right to abstain on the same-sex marriage vote because it was a "liberal" choice and part of a "nuanced argument".

Previous chairs

See also

List of LGBT-related organizations
LGBT rights in the United Kingdom
Equivalent organisations in the other major parties include
Conservatives: LGBT+ Conservatives
Labour: LGBT+ Labour
 UKIP: LGBT in UKIP
 Plaid Cymru: Plaid Pride
 SNP: Out For Independence
 Alliance: Alliance Party LGBT
 Sinn Féin: Sinn Fein LGBT
 Green Party of England and Wales: LGBTIQA+ Greens (website)

References

LGBT liberalism
Organisations associated with the Liberal Democrats (UK)
LGBT political advocacy groups in the United Kingdom
LGBT affiliate organizations of political parties
1988 establishments in the United Kingdom